Yelyshevo (Yılış) is a rural locality (a village) in Irsayevsky Selsoviet, Mishkinsky District, Bashkortostan, Russia. The population was 433 as of 2010. There are 6 streets.

Geography 
Yelyshevo is located 9 km north of Mishkino (the district's administrative centre) by road. Ozerki is the nearest rural locality.

References 

Rural localities in Mishkinsky District